Puqu or Burqug is a township located in the south of Bayi District, Nyingchi, Tibet Autonomous Region, China.

See also
List of towns and villages in Tibet

Notes

Populated places in Nyingchi